Arsenic pentoxide is the inorganic compound with the formula As2O5.  This glassy, white, deliquescent solid is relatively unstable, consistent with the rarity of the As(V) oxidation state.  More common, and far more important commercially, is arsenic(III) oxide (As2O3).  All inorganic arsenic compounds are highly toxic and thus find only limited commercial applications.

Structure
The structure consists of tetrahedral {AsO4} and octahedral {AsO6} centers linked by sharing corners.    The structure differs from that of the corresponding phosphorus(V) oxide; as a result, although there is still a solid solution with that oxide, it only progresses to the equimolar point, at which point phosphorus has substituted for arsenic in all of its tetrahedral sites. Likewise, arsenic pentoxide can also dissolve up to an equimolar amount of antimony pentoxide, as antimony substitutes for arsenic only in its octahedral sites.

Synthesis

Historical
Paracelsus Macquer found a crystallizable salt which he called ‘sel neutre arsenical’. This salt was the residue obtained after distilling nitric acid from a mixture of potassium nitrate and arsenic trioxide. Previously Paracelsus heated a mixture of arsenic trioxide and potassium nitrate. He applied the term ‘arsenicum fixum’ to the product. A. Libavius called the same  product ‘butyrum arsenici’ (butter of arsenic), although this term was actually used for arsenic trichloride. The products that Paracelsus and Libavius found were all impure alkali arsenates.  Scheele prepared a number of arsenates by the action of arsenic acid on the alkalies. One of the arsenates that he prepared, was arsenic pentoxide.  The water in the alkalies evaporated at 180˚C, and the arsenic pentoxide was stable below 400˚C .

Modern methods
Arsenic pentoxide can be crystallized by heating As2O3 under oxygen. This reaction is reversible:

As2O5    As2O3 + O2 

Strong oxidizing agents such as ozone, hydrogen peroxide, and nitric acid convert arsenic trioxide to the pentoxide.

Arsenic acid can be generated via routine processing of arsenic compounds including the oxidation of arsenic and arsenic-containing minerals in air. Illustrative is the roasting of orpiment, a typical arsenic sulfide ore:
2 As2S3  +  11 O2   →  2 As2O5 + 6 SO2

Safety

Like all inorganic arsenic compounds, the pentoxide is highly toxic.  Its reduced derivative arsenite, which is an As(III) compound, is even more toxic since it has a high affinity for thiol groups of cysteine residues in proteins.

It is classified as an extremely hazardous substance in the United States as defined in Section 302 of the U.S. Emergency Planning and Community Right-to-Know Act (42 U.S.C. 11002), and is subject to strict reporting requirements by facilities which produce, store, or use it in significant quantities.

References

External links
NIOSH Pocket Guide to Chemical Hazards
IARC Monograph – Arsenic and Arsenic Compounds
NTP Report on Carcinogens – Inorganic Arsenic Compounds
ESIS: European chemical Substances Information System

Arsenic(V) compounds
Oxides
IARC Group 1 carcinogens